Agnes Asangalisa Chigabatia (born October 20, 1956) is a Ghanaian female politician and former member of the parliament for Builsa North Constituency.

Early life and education 
Agnes Chigabatia was born on 20 October 1956 at Chuchuliga in the Upper East Region of Ghana. She acquired her middle school education at Adda Middle School in Navrongo and Ayieta Middle School in Sandema. Agnes later had her secondary school education at St. Francis Girls' Senior High School, Jirapa. She furthered her education at the Accra Polytechnic where she acquired an Advance Level in Catering Certificate.

Career 
Chigabatia is a caterer by profession.

Politics 
Agnes Chigabatia contested in the 2004 parliamentary elections on the ticket of the New Patriotic Party of which she won. She pulled a total vote 6,160 representing 33.70%.  She served for a period of four years (7 January 2005 -  7 January 2009). Within this same period, Agnes was also the Deputy Minister for the Upper East Region. Agnes lost her position as member of parliament during the 2008 election where she lost to Timothy Awotiirim Ataboadey.

Elections  
Chigabatia was elected as the member of parliament for the Builsa North constituency of the Upper East Region of Ghana for the first time in the 2004 Ghanaian general elections. She won on the ticket of the New Patriotic Party. Her constituency was a part of the 2 parliamentary seats out of 13 seats won by the New Patriotic Party in that election for the Upper East Region. The New Patriotic Party won a majority total of 128 parliamentary seats out of 230 seats.  She was elected with 6,160 votes out of  18,273 total valid votes cast. This was  equivalent to 33.7% of total valid votes cast. She was elected over Thomas Akum-Yong of the Peoples’ National Convention, Awontiirim Ataboadey Timothy of the National Democratic Congress and Abaayiak Ayulim Grace of the Convention People's Party. These obtained 5,657, 6,147 and 309 votes respectively out of the total valid votes cast. These were equivalent to 31%, 33.6% and 1.7% respectively of total valid votes cast.

Personal life  
Chigabatia is a Christian.

References 

1956 births
Living people
Ghanaian MPs 2005–2009
New Patriotic Party politicians
Women members of the Parliament of Ghana
21st-century Ghanaian women politicians
Accra Technical University alumni